Turris annulata, common name the ringed pleurotoma, is a species of sea snail, a marine gastropod mollusk in the family Turridae, the turrids.

Description
The length of the shell attains 59 mm.

(Original description) The brow, solid shell is subulate. The whorls are slightly convex, encircled with a number of smooth, paler ridges, like rings. The siphonal canal is rather long.

Distribution
This marine species occurs off the Philippines, India, Thailand; in the East China Sea and the Sea of Japan.

References

 Kilburn R.N., Fedosov A.E. & Olivera B.M. (2012) Revision of the genus Turris Batsch, 1789 (Gastropoda: Conoidea: Turridae) with the description of six new species. Zootaxa 3244: 1-58. 
 Liu, J.Y. [Ruiyu] (ed.). (2008). Checklist of marine biota of China seas. China Science Press. 1267 pp.

External links
 Adams, A. & Reeve, L. A. (1848-1850). Mollusca. In A. Adams (ed.), The zoology of the voyage of H.M.S. Samarang, under the command of Captain Sir Edward Belcher, C.B., F.R.A.S., F.G.S., during the years 1843-1846. Reeve & Benham, London, x + 87 pp., 24 pls.

annulata
Gastropods described in 1843